Martin Hyde may refer to:
 Martin Hyde, candidate in the 2007 Ontario provincial election
 Martin Hyde, a character in an episode of Highlander: The Series
 Martin Hyde: The Duke's Messenger, a 1910 historical novel by John Masefield

See also
 Martin Hyder (born 1961), English actor and writer